Nike Assists the Wounded Warrior (German: Nike richtet den Verwundeten auf) is an outdoor 1853 sculpture by Ludwig Wilhelm Wichmann, installed on Schlossbrücke in Berlin, Germany.

See also

 1853 in art

References

External links
 

1853 establishments in Germany
1853 sculptures
Outdoor sculptures in Berlin
Sculptures of Nike
Sculptures of men in Germany
Statues in Germany